Stage machinery, also known as stage mechanics, comprises the mechanical devices used to create special effects in theatrical productions.

See also
 Scenic design

References

Scenic design